Bobby Felder (born September 23, 1990) is an American football cornerback who is currently a free agent. He signed with the Vikings after going undrafted in the 2012 NFL Draft.

Early years
Felder attended McComb High School in McComb, Mississippi.

College career
Felder enrolled at Nicholls State University after receiving scholarship offers from at least two other schools.  He cited fellow NFL cornerback and Nicholls State alum Ladarius Webb as one of the reasons for choosing Nicholls State.

Felder had 11 career interceptions in college.

Professional career
Felder went undrafted and subsequently signed with the Minnesota Vikings on May 1, 2012.  He was waived by the team on August 31, 2012 and signed to the Vikings practice squad the next day.  After re-signing with the team on January 7, 2013, Felder was put on the injured reserve list of the Minnesota Vikings on August 31, 2013 as the team trimmed its players to a 53-man roster.

Tampa Bay Buccaneers claimed Bobby Felder off waivers from the Vikings on October 29, 2013.

He was signed by the Buffalo Bills, but waived on Sept 3rd, 2014.

On January 12, 2016, Felder was assigned to the Orlando Predators of the Arena Football League (AFL). On March 22, 2016, Felder was placed on recallable reassignment.

References

External links
Nicholls State bio
Minnesota Vikings bio
Tampa Bay Buccaneers bio

1990 births
Living people
American football cornerbacks
Nicholls Colonels football players
Minnesota Vikings players
Tampa Bay Buccaneers players
People from McComb, Mississippi
Players of American football from Mississippi
Hamilton Tiger-Cats players
Orlando Predators players